The 2014 Match des Champions was the 9th edition of the annual super cup game in French basketball. This year the reigning LNB Pro A champions Limoges CSP faced off against French Cup champions JSF Nanterre. The game was played in the Kindarena in Rouen.

Nanterre won the game 54–70 and Kyle Weems was named Most Valuable Player of the 2015 Match.

Match

References

2014
Match